Cornelius Sheehan could refer to:

Connie Sheehan (1889-1950), Irish hurler
Neil Sheehan (Cornelius Mahoney Sheehan, 1936–2021), American journalist
Con Sheehan (born 1989), Irish boxer